"Can't Stand Losing You" is a song by English rock band the Police, released from their debut album Outlandos d'Amour, both in 1978. The song also was released as the follow-up single to "Roxanne", reaching number 2 in the UK Singles Chart on a re-release in 1979. It was written by the band's lead singer and bassist Sting as a song about suicide.

Composition
"Can't Stand Losing You" features lyrics which, according to Sting, is "about a teenage suicide, which is always a bit of a joke." Sting also claimed that the lyrics took him only five minutes to write.<ref name="Sting">{{cite web|title= The Police: Can't Stand Losing You, 7 |website= Sting.com |accessdate= 24 November 2014 |url= http://www.sting.com/discography/index/album/albumId/141/tagName/Singles%20(The%20Police) |url-status= dead |archiveurl= https://web.archive.org/web/20180802223551/https://www.sting.com/discography/index/album/albumId/141/tagName/Singles%20(The%20Police) |archivedate= 2 August 2018}}</ref> The song is musically similar to "Roxanne", with both songs bearing a reggae influence and a rock chorus. The song also makes use of the Echoplex delay unit. Sting sings lead vocals on the song, which he described as "up and down, strange, high-pitched singing."

"Dead End Job", the B-side of "Can't Stand Losing You", is based on a riff Copeland wrote in high school. Sting's lyrics mention being a teacher as a dead-end job, which was his job before joining the Police. The song was only available on vinyl until the release of 1993's Message in a Box.

ReceptionCash Box praised the power of the refrain and said that "the vocals easily match the energy of the three-piece instrumentals."

Commercial performance
The original single capped at number 42 in late 1978, but the June 1979 reissue nearly topped the UK Singles charts. "Can't Stand Losing You" also appeared on the UK singles charts in 1980, as part of the Six Pack singles compilation set. The package (consisting of six 7-inch vinyl singles) peaked at number 17 on the UK charts in June 1980. In 1995, a live version of the song was released as a single and reached number 27 in the charts.

Controversy
The original single was banned by the BBC because of the controversial cover (an alternative cover was released in some places). As Sting described: "The reason they [the BBC] had a problem with "Can't Stand Losing You" was because the photo on the cover of the single had Stewart standing on a block of ice with a noose around his neck, waiting for the ice to melt." Despite this, or perhaps because of the extra attention from the controversy, it became the group's first single to break the charts, and has held a spot in their live sets ever since it was written. The photography on the controversial cover was by Peter Gravelle.

Live performances
The instrumental track "Reggatta de Blanc" from the album of the same name originated from an improvisational stage jam played during live performances of "Can't Stand Losing You". This instrumental track went on to win the Grammy Award for Best Rock Instrumental Performance in 1981.

The Police performed the song on the BBC2 television show The Old Grey Whistle Test'' in 1978, which was their first performance on television. Sting wore a pair of oversized sunglasses as a result of a mishap with a can of hairspray during makeup, which required a trip to the hospital.

Music videos
Two music videos exist for the song. One features the group playing the song on a stage with Sting wearing huge glasses. Slow motion shots of the group live appear as well. The second features the group performing the song in front of a red backdrop. This was filmed on the same day as the red backdropped version of "Roxanne".

Personnel 

 Sting – bass guitar, lead and backing vocals
 Andy Summers – electric guitar
 Stewart Copeland – drums, percussion

Chart performance

Weekly charts

Year-end charts

References

1978 songs
1978 singles
1979 singles
A&M Records singles
The Police songs
Songs about suicide
Songs written by Sting (musician)